MotionDSP is a Burlingame, California-based company making real-time, GPU-accelerated image processing software for Full Motion Video (FMV) and Wide Area Motion Imagery (WAMI). MotionDSP's “Ikena” family of Windows-based products improve the quality of video from ISR platforms, as well as a variety of video formats such as mobile phones and security cameras (CCTV). "Ikena ISR" is designed for real-time FMV applications (military and homeland security markets), and "Ikena" is designed for forensic video enhancement applications (law enforcement and commercial security markets). MotionDSP's solutions support operational deployments within the US Department of Defense and National Intelligence agencies, and its customers also include the US Air Force, Navy, and some of the world's leading video forensic labs such as the US Secret Service, NCIS, and the London Metropolitan Police (Scotland Yard).

On February 22, 2018, Cubic Corporation announced its acquisition of MotionDSP.

References

External links
 Wall Street Journal article
 Video interview with MotionDSP CEO on This Week in Defense News
 New York Times Article on MotionDSP
 MotionDSP's Company website
 Press Release Announcing the NVIDIA Partnership
 MIT Technology Review article on MotionDSP

Film and video technology